"365" is a song by South Korean girl group Loona. It was released on December 13, 2019, as a pre-release single from their second extended play [#], released in February 2020.

Composition 
The song was written by Hwang Yubin and was produced and arranged by Johan Gustafsson, Realmeee, and Hayley Aitken."365" is a sweet piano-led, wintertime pop and R&B ballad that features dramatic instrumentals and soaring synth elements. Lyrically, the song is full of heartfelt meaning from the group, as they sing about how they appreciate the fans who wait for them, as they promise to shine for "365" days, or the span of a year.

Commercial performance 
"365" reached number one on the US iTunes chart and debuted at the US World Digital Song Sales chart. It is their first number one single on the chart, third top ten single and fourth entry as a group.

Music video
A stripped-back music video for the song was released on group's official YouTube channel, featuring the members getting some down time in an art studio with each working on a painting.

Credits and personnel 
Credits adapted from Melon.

 Korean Lyrics - Hwang Yu-bin
 Composition & Arranged - Johan Gustafsson, Realmeee, Hayley Aitken

 Vocal Directed - Realmeee
 Background Vocal - Choi Young-kyoung

 Recording Engineer - Min Seong-su at doobdoob Studio
 Digital Editor - Jang Woo-young at doobdoob Studio, Jeong Yu-ra
 Mixing Engineer - Koo Jong-pil at KLANG STUDIO
 Mastering Engineer- Kwon Nam-woo at 821 Sound Mastering

Charts

Release history

References 

Loona (group) songs
2019 singles
2019 songs
Songs written by Hayley Aitken